Notes on the Cinematographer is a 1975 book by the French filmmaker Robert Bresson. It collects Bresson's reflections on cinema written as short aphorisms. J. M. G. Le Clézio wrote a preface for a new edition in 1988. The book was published in English in 1977, translated by Jonathan Griffin.

Reception
Publishers Weekly wrote in 1986: "The casual but succinct observations, presented here three or four to a page, consist of short paragraphs or single sentences. ... All demonstrate a scintillating curiosity and quest for perfection."

In a 2010, British Film Institute poll, Notes on the Cinematographer was ranked the second greatest book about film.

References

External links
 French publicity page 
 Publisher link for American edition

1975 non-fiction books
Books of aphorisms
Books about film
French non-fiction books
French-language books
Robert Bresson